The 2011 Population and Housing Census, branded as , was a population census in Greece conducted by the Hellenic Statistical Authority on behalf of the Greek state between 10 and 24 May 2011. It was conducted as part of the 2011 European Union census. Its purpose was to enumerate the number of people in the country as well as survey the social characteristics of the population. The census was available in 8 languages other than Greek: English, Albanian, French, Vietnamese, Russian, Arabic, Urdu and Dari.

The final results of the census were announced on 28 December 2012, with a minor correction in 2014. According to final results, the total resident population of Greece was 10,815,197 on census day. There was a margin of error of 2.84%.

Scope and format
The 2011 census was carried out to ascertain the number of people in Greece at the time of the census, the demographic, social, and economic conditions of residents and households, and the stock of buildings available in the country.  The census was conducted in a format compliant with European Union regulations. It was the first census in Greece carried out over a number of days, as opposed to a single day; this was so as to make it more convenient for residents to complete the census. It was also the first census to be conducted in accordance with the data protection guidelines of the Hellenic Data Protection Authority (el).

Results

Main demographic indicators by region

See also
2021 Greek census
Demographics of Greece
Demographic history of modern Greece

References

External links
Census 2011 results page (in Greek)
Census 2011 results page (in English)
Panorama Greek Census Data
Eurostat 2011 Census Hub

2011
2011 in Greece
2011 censuses